The 2015 African Rugby Under–19 Cup (Rugby Africa Championship) Division A was the ninth edition of the African Rugby Under-19 Cup for Under 19 national teams. It was held in Harare, Zimbabwe from August 26 to August 29.

The tournament served as Africa's qualifier for the 2016 World Rugby Under 20 Trophy. 

Namibia won the tournament and as a result qualified for the Junior Rugby Trophy. Zimbabwe automatically qualified for the Trophy due to being selected as hosts.

Matches

First round

Final round

3rd place match

Championship match

See also
 Africa Cup

References

External links
Rugby Africa Official Webpage 

2015
2015 rugby union tournaments for national teams
Under19
International rugby union competitions hosted by Zimbabwe
August 2015 sports events in Africa